Rufus Henry Gilbert (1832–1885) was an American surgeon and inventor, who worked on rapid transit in New York City.

Biography

Early years

Rufus Henry Gilbert was born in Guilford, New York on January 26, 1832. Gilbert was the son of William Dwight Gilbert, a county judge in Steuben County, New York.

Medical career

Gilbert studied at the New York College of Physicians and Surgeons and graduated to become a physician and surgeon. During his time in New York City, Gilbert became concerned with the cramped and overly centralized living conditions of the working class, seeing this as a major public health hazard, and began thinking about urban rapid transit as the key to provision of more sanitary living conditions.

During the American Civil War, he joined the 5th New York Volunteer Infantry as a surgeon, performing the first surgical procedure during the war at the Battle of Big Bethel. He eventually became Medical Director and Superintendent of the United States Army Hospitals.

Rapid transit visionary

Towards the end of the war, Gilbert's own medical issues prevented him from a further career in this field.

Gilbert subsequently became Superintendent of the Central Railroad of New Jersey, where he worked on developing rapid transport in the New York City area.

In 1870 Gilbert obtained a patent for an elevated railway using the principle of pneumatics. Gilbert incorporated a company known as the Gilbert Elevated Railway Company but had difficulty obtaining adequate financing for the venture. Ultimately Gilbert was forced to surrender control of the company to the New York Loan and Improvement Company in order to obtain sufficient capital.  The company constructed the Sixth Avenue road, known as Gilbert Elevated Railroad, which opened in 1878. Gilbert was forced out of the company by his partners soon after the road opened, however, effectively ending his career.

Death and legacy

With his health failing, Gilbert died in New York City on July 10, 1885. He was just 53 years old at the time of his death.

Footnotes

External links 
 Picture of Gilbert as an army surgeon

1832 births
1885 deaths
People from Guilford, New York
New York College of Physicians and Surgeons alumni
19th-century American inventors